Ty Taylor is an American auctioneer, author, cowboy, and musician.

Music career

Ty Taylor is a country singer, songwriter, and record producer who has performed on the Grand Ole Opry and Austin City Limits while working for Loretta Lynn and Doug Stone.

Taylor started singing and playing guitar when he was ten years old, spurred on by his mother, a musician herself, who encouraged him to pursue music. In 1991, he made his debut as a country singer at the Texas State Fair. Prior to that time, Taylor toured nationally with various groups ranging from contemporary Christian rock, to country. From 1991 to 1995, he was based out of Colorado and toured the country with his Powder River Band.

Taylor gained national acclaim for his vocals when he performed with country artists such as Loretta Lynn, Johnny Lee, Vern Gosdin, Tammy Wynette, Crystal Gayle, and Doug Stone. He has also opened for Chris LeDoux, Mark Chesnutt, Tanya Tucker, Billy Ray Cyrus, Daron Norwood, Diamond Rio, Clay Walker, Tim McGraw, and Charlie Daniels. He credits artists like George Jones, Merle Haggard, and Bob Wills as important musical influences.

In the recording studio

Ty is a traditionalist merging honky-tonk and western swing tunes with his own original material to develop the unique sound he is known for on his album Take Me As I Am. He has also recorded demos, radio jingles, and background vocals for other recording artists. This talent led him to produce records for other artists.

As A tribute artist

Since 1995, Ty Taylor has performed as a George Strait tribute act in Branson, Missouri at the Christy Lane Theater, on the Grand Ole Opry stage, Gaylord Opryland Resort & Convention Center, and "Live at the Riverfront" during the CMA Music Festival in Nashville, Tennessee.

As A cowboy author

Ty is also a real life cowboy.  When he is not entertaining, he rides, ropes, and trains his Australian shepherds and other cowdogs on his ranch.

In 2010, he collaborated on an educational and entertaining training book for herding dog enthusiasts, Stockdog Savvy, with short stories about stock dogs and their owners.

As A professional auctioneer

Taylor received the honorary title of colonel in 2006 when he graduated from the Missouri Auction School.

References

Living people
American cattlemen
American country singers
American animal care and training writers
American male non-fiction writers
Singers from Colorado
Record producers from Colorado
Tribute acts
Year of birth missing (living people)
American auctioneers